Bova Marina (Calabrian Greek: , Jalò tu Vunà;) is a comune (municipality) in the Metropolitan City of Reggio Calabria in the Italian region Calabria, located about  southwest of Catanzaro and about  southeast of Reggio Calabria. 

Bova Marina borders the following municipalities: Bova, Condofuri, Palizzi.

As evidenced by the above Greek place names, Bova Marina is one of the places where the Greek–Calabrian dialect is still spoken, a remnant of the ancient Greek colonization of Magna Graecia (South Italy and Sicily).

Main sights
In 1983, during excavations for roadwork, the ruins of the Bova Marina Synagogue were discovered.  This is the second oldest confirmed site of a synagogue in Italy, the oldest being the ancient synagogue of Ostia Antica near Rome.  Parts of the ancient mosaic floor are still intact, which display ancient Jewish symbols, such as the menorah and Solomon's knot.

References

External links
 www.comune.bovamarina.rc.it/
 New York Times article about the discovery of the Bova Marina synagogue

Cities and towns in Calabria